Bulbophyllum bicoloratum is a species of orchid in the genus Bulbophyllum.

References
The Bulbophyllum-Checklist
The Internet Orchid Species Photo Encyclopedia
Photos of Bulbophyllum bicoloratum

External links 

bicoloratum
Articles containing video clips
Plants described in 1924